, , or  is a small fjord inlet in Nordreisa Municipality in Troms og Finnmark county, Norway. The name is sometimes anglicized as Oks Fjord. At the innermost part of the fjord, lies the village of Oksfjordhamn. The European route E06 highway runs along the southern side of the fjord. The fjord empties into the large Reisafjorden to the west.

See also
 List of Norwegian fjords

References

Fjords of Troms og Finnmark
Nordreisa